It's My Life is a 2018 South Korean television series starring Park Yoon-jae, Seo Hyo-rim, Jin Ye-sol and Kang Tae-sung. The series aired daily on KBS1 from 8:25 p.m. to 9:00 p.m. (KST) from November 5, 2018 to April 26, 2019.

Cast

Main
 Park Yoon-jae as Yang Nam-jin
 Seo Hyo-rim as Han Seung-joo
 Jin Ye-sol as Jeong Jin-ah
 Kang Tae-sung as Choi Shi-woo

Supporting
 Jo Duk-hyun as Lee Sang-hyeon
 Hong Yo-seob as Han Man-seok
 Kim Hye-ri as Choi Soo-hee
 Nam Il-woo as Ahn Seok-ho
 Kang Doo as Go Seon-gyoo
 Baek Soo-ryun as Mrs. Kang
 Im Chae-moo as Jang Hee-cheol
 Kim Do-yeon
 Lee Jong-nam as Yang Soon-ja
 Lee Shi-ah
 Kang Shin-il as Heo Chung-san
 Yuk Dong-il as Kang Dae-shik
 Song Min-ji as Seo Yeon-ji
 Yoo Ji-yeon as Ko Yeon-shil
 Kim Kyung-ryong as Kang Dae-shik's father
 Jeon Jin-seo

Special appearances
 Kim Gwang-in
 Dong Yoon-seok

Viewership
 In this table,  represent the lowest ratings and  represent the highest ratings.
 N/A denotes that the rating is not known.

Awards and nominations

Notes

References

External links
  
 

Korean Broadcasting System television dramas
2018 South Korean television series debuts
2019 South Korean television series endings
Korean-language television shows